Isaac Rodríguez (born March 3, 1991) is a Mexican professional baseball infielder for the Toros de Tijuana of the Mexican League.

Career
On June 30, 2015, Rodríguez signed with the Toros de Tijuana of the Mexican League. In his debut year, he slashed .273/.333/.364 with 1 RBI in 14 games. In 2016, Rodríguez played in 83 games for Tijuana, slashing .307/.365/.389 with 2 home runs and 27 RBI. The following season, Rodríguez batted .271/.345/.346 with 3 home runs and 27 RBI in 74 games for the Toros. In 2018, Rodriguez hit career-highs in home runs (8) and RBI (61) in 103 contests for Tijuana. For the 2019 season, Rodríguez hit .316/.389/.430 with 8 home runs and 55 RBI. Rodríguez did not play in a game in 2020 due to the cancellation of the Mexican League season because of the COVID-19 pandemic.

International career
Rodríguez was selected to the Mexico national baseball team at the 2020 Summer Olympics (contested in 2021).

References

External links

1991 births
Living people
Toros de Tijuana players
Venados de Mazatlán players
Cañeros de Los Mochis players
Baseball players from Sonora
Sportspeople from Hermosillo
Baseball players at the 2020 Summer Olympics
Olympic baseball players of Mexico
21st-century Mexican people